Woodlake Airport  is a public airport located two miles (3.2 km) south of Woodlake, serving Tulare County, California, United States.

References 
Woodlake Airport (City of Woodlake website)

External links 

Airports in Tulare County, California